Adiantum aleuticum, the western maidenhair fern or Aleutian maidenhair, is a species of deciduous fern in the genus Adiantum.

Description
A. aleuticum typically grows about 18-30 inches tall and wide. When growing in relative shade, fronds are held horizontally, but it also can grow in high mountains in full sun (often on serpentine rock) with fronds held vertically. New fronds unfurl from a tight coil (circinate vernation) held on a tall stalk. Oblong sori (masses of spores) form beneath a curled-under leaflet edge (false indusium).

Taxonomy
Formerly classified as A. pedatum var. aleuticum, it was shown to be a separate species in 1991.

Other common names include serpentine maidenhair and five-fingered fern.

Distribution and habitat
Adiantum aleuticum is native mainly to western North America from the Aleutian Islands of Alaska, south to Chihuahua, and also locally in northeastern North America from Newfoundland south to Vermont. It prefers fertile, moist soil in rock crevices near streams, from sea level in the north of its range, up to 3,200 m altitude in the south of its range. It tolerates serpentinite rock well, and is confined to this mineral-rich rock in some areas. When growing on sunny serpentine talus and bedrock, the fronds are held vertically, giving the fern a rather different general appearance.

Cultivation
The species
and its cultivar 'Subpumilum' have gained the Royal Horticultural Society's Award of Garden Merit. Though hardy they may also be grown as houseplants. They prefer low to medium light, and will grow in moist potting mix. They may prove difficult to keep alive in dry climates.

Etymology
Adiantum is derived from Greek and means 'unwetted'. This name is in reference to the fact that its leaves do not become saturated, even when they are submerged in water. In the US, they are suitable for USDA hardiness zones 3–8.

Aleuticum means 'from the Aleutian Islands'.

Cultivars 
Cultivars include:

 'Japonicum'
 'Imbricatum'
 'Subpumilum'

See also
 Adiantum pedatum (five-fingered fern)

References

External links

PFAF: Adiantum aleuticum
Rainyside.com: Adiantum aleuticum
Ferns et al. of New England — "Western maidenhair" photo

aleuticum
Flora of the Northwestern United States
Flora of the Southwestern United States
Flora of the West Coast of the United States
Flora of Alberta
Flora of Alaska
Flora of British Columbia
Flora of Maine
Flora of Michigan
Flora of Newfoundland
Flora of Quebec
Flora of Vermont
Plants described in 1845